The ranks and insignia of the German Forest Service were the paramilitary rank system used by the forest services in Nazi Germany. The collar tabs and shoulder boards underlay identified the service. Green for State Forest Service, gray for Municipal Forest Service, black for Luftwaffe and Heer Forest Service and brown for Private Forest Service.

Rank Insignia

Ranks (1934–1938)

Ranks (1938–1942)

Ranks (1942–1945)

References

Citations

Bibliography 

 

Forest protection